Engraved Within is a demo album by symphonic metal band Serenity released on April 17, 2005, in Europe on the Napalm Records label. The album was forerunner for Serenity's debut full-length album Words Untold & Dreams Unlived. The album was produced by lead vocalist Georg Neuhauser, Thomas Buchberger, and Mario Hirzinger. Artworks and layout for the album were created by Thomas Buchberger.

Engraved Within received outstanding reviews all over Europe upon release, among them "Demo of the Month" in German Rock Hard and Metal Hammer magazines.

Tracks 2, 3, 4, & 6, would be remade and later appear on Serenity's album Words Untold & Dreams Unlived. Track 5, "Journey's End", would be re-recorded as well, and appear as a bonus track on their 2008 album Fallen Sanctuary.

History 
Engraved Within was released on April 17, 2005, through an independent record label. The album was produced by band members Thomas Buchberger, Mario Hirzinger and Georg Neuhauser with the mixing and mastering done at Dreamscape Studios in Munich. The demo was shipped around to various recording companies and was eventually picked up by Napalm Records.

Reception 
Engraved Within brought out strong reviews immediately upon its release from the metal world. Metal Observer, gave the album 9 out of 10, stating, "Serenity is a highly gifted band from Austria, and they deliver us a killer demo, which blew me totally away! Engraved Within is nearly perfect, that begins with the production, the songs, vocals, musicianship, songwriting...."

Another review of the album, from Rock Report, states, "this 7-track demo clearly shows what great potential this band has. This material is so strong that it can only be a matter of time before these guys get signed."

A website, selaludiam.com, stated, "Serenity is a highly gifted band from Austria, and they deliver us a killer demo, which blew me totally away."

Track listing

Personnel
 Georg Neuhauser - lead vocals
 Thomas Buchberger - lead and rhythm guitars
 Simon Holzknecht - bass guitar
 Mario Hirzinger - keyboard, backing vocals
 Andreas Schipflinger - drums, backing vocals
 Franz-Josef Hauser - additional keyboards and piano

Production
 Produced by Buchberger/Hirzinger/Neuhauser.
 All songs written by Buchberger/Hirzinger/Neuhauser except "Dead Man Walking".
 "Dead Man Walking" written by Buchberger/Hirzinger/Neuhauser and Anker.
 Orchestrations by Franz-Josef Hauser
 Recorded at Serenity Dungeon Wörgl, Giant Hall Studio, and Avalon Studios Kramsach
 Drums recorded by Gottfried Plank at Hyperion Studios Schwaz
 Mixed and mastered by Jan Vacik at Dreamscape Studios in Munich.

References

2005 albums
Napalm Records albums
Serenity (band) albums
Demo albums